Desulfovibrio bizertensis  is a weakly halotolerant, strictly anaerobic, sulfate-reducing and motile bacterium from the genus of Desulfovibrio which has been isolated from marine sediments from Tunisia.

References

External links
Type strain of Desulfovibrio bizertensis at BacDive -  the Bacterial Diversity Metadatabase	

Bacteria described in 2006
Desulfovibrio